John James Williams (29 March 1911 – 12 October 1987) was a professional footballer, who played for several clubs, including Huddersfield Town and Aston Villa. He was born in Aberdare, Wales. He made one appearance for Wales against France in 1939.

References

Jackie Williams' profile at Pride of Anglia

1911 births
1979 deaths
Welsh footballers
Wales international footballers
Footballers from Aberdare
Association football midfielders
English Football League players
Southern Football League players
Cymru Premier players
Huddersfield Town A.F.C. players
Aston Villa F.C. players
Ipswich Town F.C. players
Wrexham A.F.C. players